Jamsai is a publishing company located in Bangkok, Thailand.  Publishing since 2002, Jamsai has four brands:  Jamsai Publishing Books, Enter Books Publishing, Zion Press Publishing, and Book Wave Publishing.  It is considered one of the largest publishers of teen romantic fiction in Thailand. This publishing company has published many famous Thai writers. Jamsai also supports many charities benefitting local communities.

Jamsai's publishing operation releases romantic fiction books targeting women, as well as general interest, young adult literature, suspense, fantasy, contemporary fiction, business and computer technology, as well as educational books for children. Jamsai's website is also one of the most popular websites in Thailand.

Type of book Jamsai publishing
ความรู้สึกดี... ที่เรียกว่ารัก
Jamsai Love Series
มากกว่ารัก
Cookie
Enter Light Novel
Jamsai Light Novel
Jamsai
Jamsai Award
Dreamland Of Love
Magic Cafe' Love
Magic Cafe
Book Wave (การ์ตูนอัจฉริยะ)
Sweet Asian
Enter Books
ปกิณกะ
romantic suspense
Sweet Asian
Dreamland Of Love
Magic Cafe' Love
Magic Caf'
EverY

Gallery

References

External links
Jamsai's Website (in Thai)

Publishing companies of Thailand
Mass media companies of Thailand
Companies based in Bangkok
Publishing companies established in 2002
Book publishing companies of Thailand
2002 establishments in Thailand
Mass media in Bangkok